Flap surgery is a technique in plastic and reconstructive surgery where any type of tissue is lifted from a donor site and moved to a recipient site with an intact blood supply. This is distinct from a graft, which does not have an intact blood supply and therefore relies on growth of new blood vessels. This is done to fill a defect such as a wound resulting from injury or surgery when the remaining tissue is unable to support a graft, or to rebuild more complex anatomic structures such as breast or jaw.

Uses 
Flap surgery is a technique essential to plastic and reconstructive surgery. A flap is defined as a tissue that can be moved to another site and has its own blood supply. This is in comparison to a skin graft which does not have its own blood supply and relies on vascularization from the recipient site. Flaps have many uses in wound healing and are used when wounds are large, complex, or need tissue and bulk for successful closure.

Common uses:

 Abdominal wall reconstruction
 Breast reconstruction
 Hand reconstruction
 Mandible reconstruction
 Rhinoplasty
 Scar revision
 Skin cancer

Anatomy

Anatomy of a flap 
"Plastic surgery is a constant battle between blood supply and beauty." - Sir Harold Gillies

Flaps can contain many different combination of layers of tissue, from skin to bone (see classification section). The main goal of a flap is to maintain blood flow to tissue to maintain survival and understanding the anatomy in flap design is key to a successful flap and surgery.

Skin anatomy 
Flaps may include skin in their construction. Skin is important for many reasons, but namely its role in thermoregulation, immune function, and blood supply aid in flap survival. The skin can be divided into three main layers including the epidermis, the dermis, and the subcutaneous tissue. Blood is supplied to the skin mainly by two networks of blood vessels. The deep network lies between the dermis and the subcutaneous tissue, while the shallow network lies within the papillary layer of the dermis.The epidermis is supplied by diffusion from this shallow network and both networks are supplied by collaterals, and by perforating arteries that bring blood from deeper layers either between muscles (septocutaneous perforators) or through muscles (musculocutaneous perforators).

This robust and redundant blood supply is important in flap surgery.This is important because flaps rely on named blood vessels and redundancy in blood supply since the flap will be cut off from other blood vessels when the flap is raised and removed from its surrounding native tissue. The remaining blood supply must then keep the tissue alive until  additional blood supply can be formed through a process called angiogenesis.

Angiosome 
The angiosome is a concept first coined by Ian Taylor in 1987. An angiosome is a three-dimensional region of tissue that is supplied by a single artery and can include skin, soft tissue, and bone.Adjacent angiosomes are connected by narrower choke vessels and so multiple angiosomes can be supplied by a single artery. Knowledge of these supply arteries and their associated angiosomes is useful in planning the location, size, and shape of a flap.

Classification

Flaps can be fundamentally classified by their mechanism of movement, the types of tissues present, or by their blood supply. The surgeon should choose the least complex type that will achieve the desired effect, a concept known as the reconstructive ladder.

Mechanism of movement

Local flaps 

 Local flaps are created by freeing a layer of tissue and then stretching the freed layer to fill a defect. This is the least complex type of flap and includes advancement flaps, rotation flaps, and transposition flaps, in order from least to most complex. With an advancement flap, incisions are extended out parallel from the wound, creating a rectangle with one edge remaining intact. This rectangle is freed from the deeper tissues and then stretched (or advanced) forward to cover the wound. The flap is disconnected from the body except for the uncut edge which contains the blood supply which feeds in horizontally. A rotation flap is similar except instead of being stretched in a straight line, the flap is stretched in an arc. The more complex transposition flap involves rotating an adjacent piece of tissue, resulting in the creation of a new defect that must then be closed.

Regional flaps

 Regional or interpolation flaps are not immediately adjacent to the defect. Instead, the freed tissue "island" is moved over or underneath normal tissue to reach the defect to be filled, with the blood supply still connected to the donor site via a pedicle.This pedicle can be removed later on after new blood supply has formed. Examples: pectoralis major myocutaneous (PMMC) flap and deltopectoral (DP) flap for head and neck defects, and latissimus dorsi (LD) flap and traverse rectus abdominal muscle (TRAM) flap for breast reconstruction.

Distant flaps

 Distant flaps are used when the donor site is far from the defect. These are the most complex class of flap. Direct or tubed flaps involve having the flap connected to both the donor and recipient sites simultaneously, forming a bridge. This allows blood to be supplied by the donor site while a new blood supply from the recipient site is formed. Once this happens, the "bridge" can be disconnected from the donor site if necessary, completing the transfer. A free flap has the blood supply cut and then reattached microsurgically to a new blood supply at the recipient site.

Tissue type
Flaps can be classified by the content of the tissue within them.

Cutaneous 

 Contain the full thickness of the skin, fat, and superficial fascia and are used to fill small defects. These are typically supplied by a random blood supply. Examples: Z-plasty, deep inferior epigastric perforator (DIEP) flap, V-Y advancement flap.

Fasciocutaneous 

 Contain subcutaneous tissue and deep fascia, resulting in a more robust blood supply and ability to fill a larger defect. Cormack and Lamberty classification is used for vascular supply of faciocutaneous flaps. Examples: temporoparietal and anterolateral thigh fascocutaneous flap, lateral fasciocutaneous flap, posterior fasciocutaneous flap.

Musculocutaneous and muscle flaps 

 Contain a layer of muscle to provide bulk that can fill a deeper defect. If skin cover is needed, a skin graft can be placed over top of it. Examples: gastrocnemius flap, latissimus dorsi flap, transverse rectus abdominis myocutaneous (TRAM) flap, transverse upper gracillis (TUG) flap.

Bone 

 Contain bone and are used when structural support is needed such as in jaw reconstruction. Example: fibula flap.

Omental and Intestinal 

Omental flaps can be used in chest wall defects and intestinal flaps can be used to reconstruct tubular structures like the esophagus.

Vascular supply
Classification based on blood supply to the flap:

Axial vs random 
 Axial flaps are supplied by a named artery and vein. This allows for a larger area to be freed from surrounding and underlying tissue, leaving only a small pedicle containing the vessels.
Reverse-flow flaps are a type of axial flap in which the supply artery is cut on one end and blood is supplied by backwards flow from the other direction. Random flaps are simpler and have no named blood supply. Rather, they are supplied by generic vascular networks.

Pedicled vs free 
 Pedicled flaps remain attached to the donor site via a pedicle that contains the blood supply, in contrast to a free flap which the vessels are cut and anastomosed to another blood supply.

Contraindications 
Anyone who is unstable for surgery should not undergo flap surgery. While not absolute contraindications for flap surgery, there are a few contraindications to know. As with most surgeries, people who are sicker may have more difficulties with wound healing. This includes people with comorbidities such as diabetes, smoking, immunosuppression, and vascular disease.

Risks or complications
The risks of flap surgery include infection and wound breakdown, fluid accumulation, bleeding, damage to nearby structures, and scarring.The most notable risk in this procedure is flap death, where the flap loses blood supply. The loss of blood can be due to many reasons, but is commonly due to tension on the vascular supply and not enough blood flow to the end segments of the flap.This can sometimes be fixed with another surgery or using additional methods of healing in the reconstructive ladder.

Recovery 

As with healing of any wound, healing of a flap maintains the same process wound healing. There are four stages to wound healing: hemostasis, inflammation, proliferation, and remodeling which can take up to a year to complete.

Following flap surgery, the biggest risk in recovery is flap death. Flap failure is an uncommon occurrence but does happen. The reported flap failure rate in free flaps is less than 5%. The most commonly cause is by venous insufficiency consisting of 54% of all causes. Venous insufficiency is commonly caused by a venous thrombus within the first 2 days following surgery. After the immediate postoperative risk, the flap will continue to heal adhering to the stages of normal wound healing and will take over 3 months for an incision to be at 80% tensile strength compared to normal tissue.

History 
Skin flaps are an essential part of a surgeon’s toolbox in Plastic Surgery. It is part of the reconstructive ladder, a stepwise approach to wound closure.
The first known reports of surgical flaps originated in 600 BCE in India by Sushruta where the Tilemakers caste would reconstruct noses using regional flaps due to the practice of nose amputations as a form of legal punishment. The next description of flap surgery comes from Celsus an ancient Roman who described advancement skin flaps from 25 BC to 50 AD. In the 15th century, Gaspare Tagliacozzi an Italian surgeon helped develop the “Italian Method” for nasal reconstruction, a delayed pedicle skin graft, where the skin from the arm would be attached to the nose for many months to create the reconstruction, first printed in the 1597 book De Curtorum Chirurgia per Insitionem. The Italian method was rediscovered in 1800 by German surgeon Carl Ferdinand von Graefe. Major advancements in modern Plastic Surgery are mostly attributed to Harold Gilles who pioneered facial reconstruction during World War I using pedicled tube flaps on patients such as Walter Yeo and the development of the walking-stalk skin flap by Gilles' cousin Archibald McIndoe in 1930.

Advancements continued in flap surgery. With the introduction of the Operating Microscope Microvascular surgery advancements allowed for the anastomosis of blood vessels. This led to the ability of free tissue transfers and in 1958 Bernard Seidenberg transferred a part of the jejunum to the esophagus to remove a cancer of the esophagus. Modern advancements in flap surgeries have continued since this time and are now commonly used in many procedures.

See also
 Breast reconstruction
 DIEP flap
 Hand reconstruction
 List of plastic surgery flaps
 Plastic surgery
 Perforator flaps
 Mandible reconstruction
 Rhinoplasty
 Rotation flap
 Skin cancer
 TRAM flap
 z-plasty

References

External links
 Flap surgery at eMedicine

Oral and maxillofacial surgery
Plastic surgery
Surgical procedures and techniques